Lt. Rudolf Wagner (29 October 1921 – 11 December 1943) was a former Luftwaffe fighter ace and recipient of the Knight's Cross of the Iron Cross during World War II. Rudolf Wagner was credited with 81 aerial victories all over the Eastern Front (World War II). He was missing in action over Zhytomyr Oblast, Ukraine, in 1943 during WWII.

Career

Wagner entered the military on May 11, 1941, as an Oberfeldwebel. When he completed his training he was assigned to o IV./JG 51 - Jagdgeschwader 51. In early 1942 and he served as Otto Gaiser's wingman. Wagner scored 81 aerial victories most of then while he was piloting a Messerschmitt Bf 109; he also may have recorded kills while flying a Focke-Wulf Fw 190 in 1943.

Squadron leader and missing in action
In October 1943, when Hauptmann Wilhelm Moritz was transferred, Wagner succeeded him as Staffelführer (squadron leader) of 12. Staffel of JG 51.

He was succeeded by Oberleutnant Hugo Brönner as commander of 12. Staffel of JG 51.

Summary of career

Aerial victory claims
According to Spick, he was credited with 81 aerial victories claimed in an unknown number of combat missions. Mathews and Foreman, authors of Luftwaffe Aces — Biographies and Victory Claims, researched the German Federal Archives and found records for 79 aerial victory claims, all of which claimed on the Eastern Front.

Victory claims were logged to a map-reference (PQ = Planquadrat), for example "PQ 47594". These sectors were then subdivided into 36 smaller units to give a location area 3 × 4 km in size.

Awards
 Iron Cross x2
 Honor Goblet of the Luftwaffe on 20 September 1943 as Feldwebel and pilot
 German Cross in Gold on 17 October 1943 as Feldwebel in the 10./Jagdgeschwader 51.
 Knight's Cross of the Iron Cross on 26 March 1944 as Leutnant and pilot in the 12./Jagdgeschwader 51 "Mölders"

Notes

References

Bibliography

 
 
 
 
 
 
 
 
 
 
 

1921 births
1940s missing person cases
1943 deaths
Luftwaffe personnel killed in World War II
German World War II flying aces
Luftwaffe pilots
Recipients of the Gold German Cross
Recipients of the Knight's Cross of the Iron Cross
People from the Free People's State of Württemberg
Military personnel from Baden-Württemberg
Missing in action of World War II
Missing person cases in Ukraine